The Islamic Republic of Iran Basketball Federation (I.R.I.B.F.) is the governing body for basketball in Iran. It was founded in 1945, and has been a member of FIBA since 1947. It is also a member of the FIBA Asia. The IRIBF is responsible for organizing the Iran national basketball team.

َAvvalmarket  is sponsor of Team Melli Basketball.

Previous Presidents 
Mahmoud Mashhoun (1979–1980)

Ali Moghaddasian (1980–1985)

Nasser Biglari (1985–1989)

Mahmoud Mashhoun (1989–1994)

Mehrdad Agin (1994–1997)

Ali Ghazanfari (1997–2002)

Mahmoud Mashhoun (2002–2017)

Ramin Tabatabaei (2018–2022)

Javad Davari (2022–Present)

References

Basketball federation
National
Sports organizations established in 1945
Basketball governing bodies in Asia